Ust-Chorna (or historically Kraľovo Pole) is an urban-type settlement in Tiachiv Raion (district) of Zakarpattia Oblast (region) in western Ukraine. The settlement's population was 1,456 as of the 2001 Ukrainian Census. Current population: .

References

Urban-type settlements in Tiachiv Raion
Populated places established in the 1760s